This was the first edition of the tournament.

Illya Marchenko won the title, defeating Farrukh Dustov in the final, 6–4, 5–7, 6–2.

Seeds

Draw

Finals

Top half

Bottom half

References
 Main Draw
 Qualifying Draw

Trofeo Città di Brescia - Singles
2014